Łada Biłgoraj is a Polish football club based in Biłgoraj . The club was established in 1945.

Achievements 
 1/32 of Polish Cup in 2003/2004 season
 Poland III Liga - years: 1988–1989, 1996–1998, 1999–2003

External links 
 Official website (Polish)

Football clubs in Poland
Association football clubs established in 1945
1945 establishments in Poland
Football clubs in Lublin Voivodeship
Biłgoraj County